Hybrid testing is what most frameworks evolve/develop into overtime and multiple projects. The most successful automation frameworks generally accommodate both grammar and spelling, as well as information input. This allows information given to be cross-checked against existing and confirmed information. This helps to prevent false or misleading information being posted. It still however allows others to post new and relevant information to existing posts, and so increases the usefulness and relevance of the site. This said, no system is perfect, and it may not perform to this standard on all subjects all the time but will improve with increasing input and increasing use.

Pattern
The Hybrid-Driven Testing pattern is made up of a number of reusable modules / function libraries that are developed with the following characteristics in mind:

 Maintainability – significantly reduces the test maintenance effort
 Reusability – due to modularity of test cases and library functions
 Manageability – effective test design, execution, and traceability
 Accessibility – to design, develop & modify tests whilst executing
 Availability – scheduled execution can run unattended on a 24/7 basis
 Reliability – due to advanced error handling and scenario recovery
 Flexibility – framework independent of system or environment under test 
 Measurability – customisable reporting of test results ensure quality

See also

 Keyword-driven testing
 Test automation framework
 Test-driven development
 Modularity-driven testing

References

Software testing